Xylokorys is a genus of marrellomorph known from two specimens from the Silurian Herefordshire lagerstatte; it filter-fed on mud particles on the sea floor.  It is the only marrellomorph known from the Silurian period.

References

Silurian arthropods of Europe
Marrellomorpha